Hollywood Dun It, (1983 – 2005) was an American Quarter Horse who excelled in reining and was a record-setting stallion.  He was known for his charismatic demeanor and passing on his trait of a big stop and athletic turning style, both desirable characteristics of reining horses.

Pedigree

Hollywood Dun It was dun-colored American Quarter Horse stallion foaled in 1983.  He was euthanized on March 30, 2005 at the age of 22.  He was sired by Hollywood Jac 86 and out of Blossom Berry.

Owners

Dun It was bred by Gwen L. Steif of Kildeer, Illinois.  However, he was later purchased by Tim and  Colleen McQuay of Tioga, Texas, and their business partner Jennifer Easton from Saint Mary's Point, Minnesota. Tim McQuay was a trainer who surpassed the $2,000,000 earnings mark in the National Reining Horse Association (NHRA).

Career

Hollywood Dun It first major championship was in 1986 when then trainer Tim McQuay rode him to the NHRA Open Futurity Reserve Champion.  In 1987 he was named the NRHA Open Derby Champion and the NRHA Open Superstakes Champion.  In competition Dun It won $65,808 of NRHA winnings.

Offspring/Breeding

Dun It was retired and used solely at stud beginning in 1988. Dun It was the first sire to produce foals with earnings at $3,000,000 and then $4,000,000. He became the second stallion to reach $6,000,000 after his death--$6,007,133 to be exact. Those seven horses are Hollywoodstinseltown, Reminic N Dunit, Hollywood Vintage, Matt Dillon Dun It, Hollywood, Hollywood Downtown, and BH Hollywood Lady. His foals have won many prestigious titles, including NRHA Futurity, NRHA Derby, NRHA Superstakes, All American Quarter Horse Congress Futurity, National Reining Breeders Classic, as well as gold medals in international competition. He has also produced horses that have performed well in other disciplines such as working cow horse, horse, and barrel racing.

Hall of Fame

In 2000, Hollywood Dun It was inducted into the National Reining Horse Association Hall of Fame.  In 2012, he was inducted into the American Quarter Horse Association Hall of Fame.

Other Information

When Hollywood Dun It died, he was suffering from severe health problems including testicular cancer. In his honor, there is now an NHRA award deemed "Hollywood Dun It."

In 1998, Hollywood Dun It became the first reining horse to be made into a Breyer Horse Creation.  The response and sales were so good to the model that it became a collector's item and was taken off of the production line.  In 2002, his son followed in his footsteps and Dun Gotta Gun was also made into a Breyer Horse.

See also
 List of historical horses

References

American Quarter Horse sires
AQHA Hall of Fame (horses)